Nouziers is a commune in the Creuse department in the Nouvelle-Aquitaine region in central France.

Geography

Population

Sights

 The twelfth-century church.
 The remains of two ancient chateaux.
 An old stone cross.
 The war memorial.

See also
Communes of the Creuse department

References

Communes of Creuse